Zeta Tucanae, Latinized from ζ Tucanae, is a star in the constellation Tucana. It is a spectral class F9.5 main sequence star with an apparent magnitude of +4.23. Despite having a slightly lower mass, this star is more luminous than the Sun. Based upon parallax measurements by the Hipparcos spacecraft, it is approximately 28.0 light years from Earth. This is one of the least variable stars observed during the Hipparcos mission.

The composition and mass of this star are very similar to the Sun, with a slightly lower mass and an estimated age of three billion years. The solar-like qualities make it a target of interest for investigating the possible existence of a life-bearing planet.

Based upon an excess emission of infrared radiation at 70 micrometres, this system is believed to have a debris disk. The disk is orbiting the star at a minimum radius of 2.3 astronomical units. It is radiating with a maximum temperature of 218 K. As of 2009, no planet has been discovered in orbit around this star.

The components of this star's space velocity are U = −60, V = −4 and W = −38 km/s. These correspond to the velocity toward the galactic center, the velocity along
the direction of galactic rotation, and the velocity toward the north galactic pole, respectively. It is orbiting through the galaxy at a mean distance of 8.4 kpc from the galactic center and with an orbital eccentricity of 0.16.

See also
 List of star systems within 25–30 light-years

References

External links
 Zeta Tucanae at SolStation

F-type main-sequence stars
Tucanae, Zeta
Circumstellar disks

Tucana (constellation)
Tucanae, Zeta
Durchmusterung objects
0017
001581
001599
0077